Adelaide United Football Club is an Australian professional soccer club based in Hindmarsh, Adelaide. The club was formed in 2003. Adelaide United became the first southern member admitted into the A-League Men in 2005.

This list encompasses the honours won by Adelaide United at national, regional and friendly level, records set by the club, their managers and their players. The player records section itemises the club's leading goalscorers and those who have made most appearances in first-team competitions.

Adelaide United have won eight top-flight titles, and hold the record for the most Australia Cup wins, with three. The club's record appearance maker is Eugene Galekovic, who made 285 appearances between 2007 and 2017. Craig Goodwin is Adelaide United's record goalscorer, scoring 49 goals.

All figures are correct as of the match played on 11 March 2023.

Honours and achievements
Adelaide United's first ever silverware was won in 2006. The A-League Men Premiership, won by the club was Adelaide United's first trophy. In 2019 they became the most successful club in Australia Cup history with three titles.

Adelaide United's honours and achievements include the following:

Domestic
 A-League Men Premiership 
Winners (2): 2005–06, 2015–16
Runners-up (2): 2006–07, 2008–09

 A-League Men Championship 
Winners (1): 2016
Runners-up (2): 2007, 2009

 Australia Cup
Winners (3) – Record: 2014, 2018, 2019
Runners-up (1): 2017

 A-League Pre-Season Challenge Cup
Winners (2): 2006, 2007

AFC
 AFC Champions League
Runners-up (1): 2008

Player records

Appearances
 Most league appearances: Eugene Galekovic, 238
 Most National Cup appearances: Isaías, 22
 Most Asian appearances: Eugene Galekovic, 33
 Youngest first-team player: Teeboy Kamara, 15 years, 212 days (against Gold Coast United, A-League, 16 December 2011)
 Oldest first-team player: Romário, 40 years, 320 days (against Newcastle Jets, A-League, 15 December 2006)
 Most consecutive appearances: Eugene Galekovic, 74 (from 15 November 2008 to 26 December 2010)
 Most separate spells with the club: 3
 Nathan Konstandopoulos (2014–16; 2017–21 and 2022)
 Craig Goodwin (2014–16; 2018–19 and 2021–)

Most appearances
Competitive matches only, includes appearances as substitute. Numbers in brackets indicate goals scored.

a. Includes the National Soccer League and A-League Men.
b. Includes the A-League Pre-Season Challenge Cup and Australia Cup
c. Includes goals and appearances (including those as a substitute) in the FIFA Club World Cup and 2005 Australian Club World Championship Qualifying Tournament.

Goalscorers
 Most goals in a season: Sergio van Dijk, 17 goals (in the 2010–11 season)
 Most league goals in season: Sergio van Dijk, 16 goals in the A-League, 2010–11
 Youngest goalscorer: Mohamed Toure, 15 years, 325 days (against Central Coast Mariners, A-League, 14 February 2020)
 Youngest hat-trick scorer: Nathan Burns
 Oldest goalscorer: Romário, 40 years, 320 days (against Newcastle Jets, A-League, 15 December 2006)

Top goalscorers
Craig Goodwin is the all-time top goalscorer for Adelaide United. He passed Bruce Djite's record after scoring against Perth Glory in October 2022.

Competitive matches only. Numbers in brackets indicate appearances made.

a. Includes the National Soccer League and A-League Men.
b. Includes the A-League Pre-Season Challenge Cup and Australia Cup
c. Includes goals and appearances (including those as a substitute) in the FIFA Club World Cup and 2005 Australian Club World Championship Qualifying Tournament.

International

This section refers only to caps won while an Adelaide United player.

 First capped player: Shane Smeltz for New Zealand against United States on 8 June 2003.
 First capped player for Australia: Travis Dodd and Michael Valkanis for Australia against Kuwait on 16 August 2006.
 Most capped player: Eugene Galekovic with 8 caps for Australia.

Transfers

Record transfer fees paid

Record transfer fees received

Managerial records

 First full-time manager: John Kosmina managed Adelaide United from 1 July 2003 to 22 February 2007.
 Longest-serving manager: John Kosmina –  (1 July 2003 to 22 February 2007)
 Shortest tenure as manager: Michael Valkanis – 5 months, 2 weeks (28 January 2013 to 30 June 2013)
 Highest win percentage: Gertjan Verbeek, 53.85%
 Lowest win percentage: Michael Valkanis, 20.00%

Club records

Matches

Firsts
 First match: Adelaide United 1–0 Brisbane Strikers, National Soccer League, 17 October 2003
 First A-League Men match: Newcastle Jets 0–1 Adelaide United, 26 August 2005
 First national cup match: Adelaide United 2–2 Perth Glory, A-League Pre-Season Challenge Cup, 22 July 2005
 First Australia Cup match: Adelaide United 1–0 Wellington Phoenix, 5 August 2014
 First Asian match: Adelaide United 0–1 Shandong Luneng Taishan, AFC Champions League group stage, 7 March 2007
 First home match at Coopers Stadium: Adelaide United 1–0 Brisbane Strikers, National Soccer League, 17 October 2003
 First home match at Adelaide Oval: Adelaide United 1–3 Sydney FC, A-League, 28 December 2007

Record wins
 Record league win:
 8–1 against North Queensland Fury, A-League, 21 January 2011
 7–0 against Newcastle Jets, A-League, 24 January 2015
 Record national cup win: 6–1 against Darwin Olympic, Round of 32, 5 August 2015
 Record Asian win: 
 3–0 against Gach Dong Tam Long An, Group stage, 23 May 2007
 4–1 against Bình Dương, Group stage, 23 April 2008
 3–0 against Persipura Jayapura, Qualifying round, 16 February 2012

Record defeats
 Record league defeat: 1–7 against Brisbane Roar, A-League, 28 October 2011
 Record national cup defeat: 1–3 against Melbourne Victory, Quarter-finals, 22 September 2015
 Record Asian defeat: 0–3 against Gamba Osaka, Group stage, 22 February 2017

Record consecutive results
 Record consecutive wins: 7, from 13 November 2005 to 12 January 2006
 Record consecutive defeats: 4
 from 14 December 2007 to 13 January 2008
 from 31 October 2008 to 15 November 2008
 from 25 October 2015 to 13 November 2015
 from 14 October 2016 to 6 November 2016
 from 22 December 2019 to 11 January 2020
 from 21 February 2020 – 15 March 2020
 Record consecutive matches without a defeat: 13, from 20 January 2008 to 30 August 2008
 Record consecutive matches without a win: 9
 from 22 September 2015 to 28 November 2015
 from 3 August 2016 to 26 November 2016
 Record consecutive matches without conceding a goal: 4
 from 6 August 2005 to 9 September 2005
 from 16 July 2006 to 4 August 2006
 from 18 April 2012 to 29 May 2012
 from 1 August 2018 to 5 October 2018
 Record consecutive matches without scoring a goal: 3
 from 5 November 2008 to 15 November 2008
 from 30 March 2010 to 27 April 2010
 from 26 December 2016 to 7 January 2017
 from 24 February 2019 to 15 March 2019
 from 20 March 2022 to 2 April 2022

Goals
 Most league goals scored in a season: 51 in 30 matches, A-League, 2010–11
 Fewest league goals scored in a season: 24 in 27 matches, A-League, 2009–10
 Most league goals conceded in a season: 46 in 27 matches, A-League, 2016–17
 Fewest league goals conceded in a season: 10 in 21 matches, A-League, 2008–09

Points
 Most points in a season: 50 in 30 matches, A-League, 2010–11
 Fewest points in a season: 23 in 27 matches, A-League, 2016–17

Attendances
 Highest attendance at Hindmarsh: 17,000, against Gamba Osaka, AFC Champions League 12 November 2008
 Lowest attendance at Hindmarsh: 3,156 against Melbourne Victory, FFA Cup, 5 January 2022
 Highest attendance at Adelaide Oval: 50,119 against Western Sydney Wanderers, A-League Finals, 1 May 2016
 Lowest attendance at Adelaide Oval: 16,429 against Sydney FC, A-League, 29 December 2010

See also
 Adelaide United FC
 A-League Men

References

External links
 Official website

Adelaide United
Records